Aleksandr Safronov (12 November 1952 – 21 June 1989) was a Soviet speed skater. He competed in the men's 1000 metres events at the 1976 Winter Olympics.

References

External links
 
 
 

1952 births
1989 deaths
Soviet male speed skaters
Olympic speed skaters of the Soviet Union
Speed skaters at the 1976 Winter Olympics
World Sprint Speed Skating Championships medalists
Place of birth missing